The 2016–17 South Florida Bulls men's basketball team represented the University of South Florida during the 2016–17 NCAA Division I men's basketball season. The season marked the 46th basketball season for USF and the fourth as a member of the American Athletic Conference. They were led by interim head coach Murry Bartow. The Bulls played their home games at the USF Sun Dome on the university's Tampa, Florida campus. The Bulls finished the season 7–23, 1–17 in AAC play to finish in last place. As the No. 11 seed in the AAC tournament, they lost in the first round to UConn.

The Bulls were led by head coach Orlando Antigua for the first 13 games of the season until he was fired amid academic fraud allegations. On March 14, 2017, the school hired Brian Gregory as the next head coach.

Previous season 
The Bulls finished the 2015–16 season 8–25, 4–14 in AAC play to finish in a tie for ninth place in conference. They beat East Carolina in the first round of the AAC tournament before losing to Temple in the quarterfinals.

On July 20, 2016, Oliver Antigua, assistant coach and brother to head coach Orlando Antigua, resigned due to NCAA academic fraud allegations.

Offseason

Departures

Incoming Transfers

Incoming recruits

Roster

Schedule and results

|-
!colspan=9 style=| Exhibition

|-
!colspan=9 style=| Non-conference regular season

|-
!colspan=6 style=| AAC regular season

|-
!colspan=9 style=| AAC tournament

References

South Florida Bulls men's basketball seasons
South Florida Bulls
South Florida Bulls men's b
South Florida Bulls men's b